Henry Krieger-Coble (born  June 12, 1992) is a former American football tight end. He played college football at Iowa. His cousin is San Francisco 49ers tight end George Kittle.

Professional career

Denver Broncos
Krieger-Coble was signed by the Denver Broncos as an undrafted free agent on May 3, 2016. On September 3, 2016, he was waived by the Broncos and was signed to the practice squad the next day. He was promoted to the active roster on December 23, 2016.

On July 29, 2017, Krieger-Coble was waived by the Broncos.

Indianapolis Colts
On July 30, 2017, Krieger-Coble was claimed off waivers by the Indianapolis Colts. He was waived on September 2, 2017 and was signed to the Colts' practice squad the next day. He was released on September 26, 2017. He was re-signed to the active roster on October 6, 2017. He was once again waived by the Colts on October 27, 2017.

Los Angeles Rams
On December 27, 2017, Krieger-Coble was signed to the Los Angeles Rams' practice squad. He signed a reserve/future contract with the Rams on January 8, 2018.

On September 1, 2018, Krieger-Coble was waived by the Rams and was signed to the practice squad the next day.

References

External links
Denver Broncos bio
Indianapolis Colts bio
Iowa Hawkeyes profile

1992 births
Living people
People from Mount Pleasant, Iowa
Players of American football from Iowa
American football tight ends
Iowa Hawkeyes football players
Denver Broncos players
Indianapolis Colts players
Los Angeles Rams players